George Coleman (21 November 1916 – 27 January 2005) was a British racewalker who competed in the 1952 Summer Olympics and in the 1956 Summer Olympics. He was born in Fulham. He ranked fifth in the 10 kilometre walk in 1952 and seventh in the 20 kilometre walk in 1956.

References

1916 births
2005 deaths
Olympic athletes of Great Britain
Athletes (track and field) at the 1952 Summer Olympics
Athletes (track and field) at the 1956 Summer Olympics
People from Fulham
Athletes from London
British male racewalkers
English male racewalkers